Ruffec may refer to the following places in France:

Ruffec, Charente, a commune in the Charente department 
Ruffec, Indre, a commune in the Indre department